Golets Kropotkin is a peak in the Olyokma-Stanovik Mountains. Administratively it is part of the Transbaikal Krai, Russian Federation. The peak was named after Peter Kropotkin, who had explored the area in 1864.

This emblematic summit was declared a natural monument by the Chita Regional Executive Committee order No. 353 on 14 July 1983.

Geography
It is located in the western part of the highland area, on the border of Tungokochensky District to the west and Tungiro-Olyokminsky District to the east. 

Golets Kropotkin is a ‘’golets’’-type of mountain with a bald peak belonging to the Muroy Range, one of the subranges of the Olyokma-Stanovik mountain system.

Flora
The peak has well-defined altitudinal vegetation zones, with mountain taiga in the lower slopes, followed by pre-alpine woodland and an alpine belt further up. Some of the plants found on the southern sides include Erman's birch, golden rhododendron, Cassiope, alpine bearberry and golden dock, among others.

See also
List of mountains in Russia

References

External links
 Mountains in Tungokochensky District - Peak Visor

Mountains of Zabaykalsky Krai
ru:Голец Кропоткина